This is a list of Estonian television related events from 2011.

Events
26 February - Getter Jaani is selected to represent Estonia at the 2011 Eurovision Song Contest with her song "Rockefeller Street". She is selected to be the seventeenth Estonian Eurovision entry during Eesti Laul held at the Nokia Concert Hall in Tallinn.
12 June - Liis Lemsalu wins the fourth season of Eesti otsib superstaari.

Debuts

Television shows

1990s
Õnne 13 (1993–present)

2000s
Eesti otsib superstaari (2007–present)

Ending this year

Births

Deaths
15 January – Ellen Alaküla (born 1927), actress
26 March – Enn Klooren (born 1940), actor

See also
2011 in Estonia